Lane Pryce is a fictional character in the television series Mad Men, portrayed by Jared Harris.

An English newcomer to the United States as of 1963, he initially acts as financial officer at Sterling Cooper, but eventually leaves, along with a handful of his co-workers, to form a new agency, Sterling Cooper Draper Pryce.

For his performance, Harris was nominated for the Primetime Emmy Award for Outstanding Supporting Actor in a Drama Series in 2012.

Fictional character biography

Background and personality
Born in London on May 10, 1916, Lane was raised by Robert Pryce (W. Morgan Sheppard), himself a middle-class traveling salesman, in a strict, regimented home. In his adulthood, Lane served in the British Army as a supply assistant in Rosyth. Although he never saw combat, he was later thanked by a British veteran of World War II who said his resupply effort saved lives and "England expects every man to do his duty". After his military career was over, Lane attended accounting school. He then married a woman named Rebecca (Embeth Davidtz), with whom he had a son named Nigel. Some time later, he got hired by an advertising agency named Putnam Powell and Lowe. Eventually he was promoted to an executive position, responsible for mergers and takeovers.

Lane is portrayed as being caught between two worlds; he struggles to be himself while adjusting to his new life in America. He genuinely enjoys the United States, which he feels is detached from the rigidity and economic decay that is becoming associated with both blue-collar and white-collar England. He often appears stiff and reserved; although he does enjoy a drink, it is not to the extent of Don, who was known to drink during work hours. He isn't particularly keen on football, though he was seen in a bar with fellow British expats cheering England's performance in the 1966 World Cup Final and was able to make contacts to set up a potential account with Jaguar.

Sterling Cooper
PPL sends Lane to Sterling Cooper, which the company had recently acquired, tasking him with trimming operating expenses. He begins by firing many employees, including long-time employee Burt Peterson (Michael Gaston), who was the head of accounts, and naming Pete Campbell (Vincent Kartheiser) and Ken Cosgrove (Aaron Staton) as his joint successors. Lane angers Creative Director Don Draper (Jon Hamm) and becomes isolated from the company when he expresses PPL's lack of interest in a potentially lucrative account with Madison Square Garden. Although he is initially unaware of PPL's plans for Sterling Cooper, he later learns that he has been instructed to cut overhead so that the company can be sold for a profit. Lane's superiors at PPL announce that after sale, he is to be transferred to India - a plan that is aborted after his would-be replacement is injured in a freak accident. Don, Roger Sterling (John Slattery), and Bertram Cooper (Robert Morse) convince him to join them in starting a new agency, making him a named partner in exchange for "firing" the three of them in order to void their contracts, which contain non-compete clauses that would have otherwise prohibited their continued work in advertising.

Sterling Cooper Draper Pryce
It soon becomes apparent that Lane has a knack for managing company revenues and controlling costs, a talent the other partners lack, which is needed at the new firm. Lane, along with office manager Joan Harris (Christina Hendricks), is credited with keeping the company running and managing the day-to-day operations.

In Season 4, Lane's marriage falls apart, as Rebecca, who genuinely loves him, finds the strains of homesickness and culture shock too much to bear, and returns with their son to London indefinitely. Lane and Don end up meeting at work, then get drunk and go for a night out on the town, which includes seeing Gamera. Lane makes monster noises and slurred Japanese remarks to a married couple in the audience, which Don considers hilarious but is taken as obnoxious by the husband of the couple, who nearly challenges both Lane and Don to take it outside. Lane then sleeps with a prostitute supplied by Don. Lane reimburses Don for the money he spent on the prostitute, and thanks him for the "welcome distraction". When Lane's family is supposed to come to New York to see him, he is instead visited by his elderly father, who intends to take Lane home to England to sort out his affairs. Around the same time, Lane begins a relationship with a young African-American Playboy Bunny named Toni (Naturi Naughton), and later introduces her to his father. His father beats Lane with his cane, ordering him to return to London to reunite with his family. Lane takes a short leave-of-absence from the agency, and later returns to New York with his family, who by now are more accepting of being overseas. Although he seems to have got his home life in order, Lane still has signs of a wandering eye, particularly when he finds a lost wallet. Lane does not touch any of the man's cash or credit cards, but notices he has an attractive wife and keeps the wallet photo for himself prior to contacting the owner.

In Season 5, Lane faces severe financial troubles due to owing a tax demand and struggles to keep his balance at work. During three years at Sterling Cooper Draper Pryce, he has been operating at a loss and struggles to turn the agency around. Though Lane and Joan are friendly compatriots, responsible for keeping the company going, Lane often makes inappropriate sexual remarks that upset and disgust her. Lane is the one responsible for getting Joan her 5 percent speaking partnership. While ultimately in Joan's best long-term interests, Lane makes the suggestion to her as a means of covering up his embezzlement. If she had accepted the original cash offer, his theft would have been discovered but the cashless partnership kept it concealed a while longer.

Embezzlement and death
While Lane's work has been vital to SCDP, he has struggled with making ends meet since SCDP has yet to return any profit on his partnership investments. When, as a junior partner, Lane was required to pay in a further $50,000 (approximately $435,000 in 2021 USD) to keep the company afloat after the loss of Lucky Strike, Lane liquidated the majority of his savings to pay the partner fee. Since his savings had been invested in securities he had with a brokerage house in the UK, this subjects him to another financial issue: England's high taxes of the 1960s. After a lengthy negotiation, Lane is told by his lawyer that to resolve the issue, he must pay the $8,000 (approximately $70,000 in 2021 USD) he owes in back taxes in two days, to avoid jail or charges. Lane does not have sufficient funds to pay the bill.

To pay the tax collector, Lane comes up with a plot, where he first extends the company's line of credit for an additional $50,000 by presenting their projections as firm commitments, and then reports the loaned money as a profit surplus to the other partners, proposing it be spent providing Christmas bonuses to all employees. Lane's own bonus would, conveniently, be the amount he needs to cover the taxes. This plan is frustrated when Don pushes distribution of the bonuses to the Christmas party in two weeks, rather than immediately, and Campbell points out they will need the funds as seed money for the Jaguar account, should they land it. Unable to wait, Lane embezzles $7,500 from the company by forging Don's signature on the supposed Christmas bonus payment he anticipates receiving in two weeks.

The business unexpectedly loses a significant revenue stream when one of their major clients, Mohawk Air, suspends all advertising. They will now need the "surplus" to cover costs until January, instead of paying Christmas bonuses, panicking Lane. Lane's lies to the bank to extend credit are nearly uncovered when Herb Rennet, head of the Jaguar account, demands a night with Joan Harris in exchange for choosing SCDP as their advertisement company. The partners request Lane extend their line of credit to cover a payment to Joan for the act, unaware that Lane has already done so and will not be able to get more. Lane is able to avoid detection by advising Joan to request a cashless 5 percent partnership stake instead of a one time pay out, but is still left uneasy when the partners refuse to change their minds about taking Christmas bonuses.

Bert Cooper discovers the forged check when looking through unopened account statements. Bert confronts Don about his approving a bonus payment to Lane when the firm decided to not pay bonuses. Don tells Bert he will handle it, but does not inform him that he did not sign the check. Don confronts Lane, who admits to the embezzlement after trying to lie his way out of it. Don says Lane should have informed him of the matter. Erupting with anger, Lane insists he could not bear the shame of asking for a loan and has never been adequately compensated for his contribution to the agency. Lane feels owed and entitled to the money and tries to justify it as a two week loan, which was frustrated after the announcement that partners would not receive bonuses. He also makes a snide remark about Don's jet set lifestyle, and generally tries to justify his fraudulent actions. Don has lost all trust in Lane, and says that while he will cover the $7,500 and not involve the police or other partners, Lane is fired. Don gives Lane the weekend to "think of an elegant exit" and resign on Monday, offering comfort that Lane can start again. Though being fired will not cancel his share in the company, Lane will lose his visa and be required to return to England. On his way out of the office, Lane makes a lewd sexual remark to the newly-"wealthy" Joan Harris, who was talking about vacation plans to celebrate her new partnership, and seems grimly happy when she responds with muted anger.

Upon returning home after this encounter, Lane discovers that his wife, Rebecca, unaware of their financial situation, has bought him a new Jaguar as a surprise (paid by check). Lane puts his affairs in order and attempts to take his life via carbon monoxide poisoning. The suicide attempt fails when the Jaguar doesn't start. He then goes to SCDP, types a resignation letter and hangs himself in his office. Joan arrives Monday morning to assume her usual duties, but has trouble opening the door to Lane's office. She is suspicious upon seeing knocked-over furniture through the small gap in the door and a strong, unpleasant smell. She goes into the adjacent office, which happens to be Pete Campbell's, to say she thinks something isn't right. Upon standing on his sofa to see over the privacy wall, Pete discovers what has happened. The partners send all SCDP employees home, falsely claiming they need to evacuate due to a "building emergency", and also find a boilerplate resignation letter. When Don shows up with Roger, Bert breaks the news to him. Don is aghast that everyone left Lane's office as is (as the police told them to stay out of the office so a report could be made) and demands Lane's body be cut down immediately.

In the wake of Lane's suicide, the partners are left mourning the loss. Joan, in particular, feels guilty over dismissing his advances, and she confesses to Don that she wonders if Lane wouldn't have killed himself if she had slept with him. Don has kept the embezzlement a secret and revealed to no one that he had fired Lane the Friday before the suicide. The business is doing better than ever; SCDP has landed a significant, new client, Dow Corning, on top of Jaguar, received a hefty $175,000 insurance payout from Lane's death (approximately $1.5 million in 2021 USD), and have posted their first profitable quarter. They begin looking to expand their offices and staff. Suffering guilt and haunted by visions of his brother, Adam, who hanged himself in a similar way, Don elects to make a full refund of Lane's $50,000 partnership fee to his widow, Rebecca Pryce (which also, conveniently, avoids her inheriting the shares or profits). In response, Rebecca claims that Lane was worth more to the agency than $50,000 and accuses Don and the partners of filling "a man like that with ambition", leading to his corruption and eventual suicide.

References

External links
 Lane Pryce official AMC biography

Fictional advertising executives
Television characters introduced in 2009
Fictional English people
Fictional immigrants to the United States
Fictional suicides
Fictional World War II veterans
Mad Men characters
Male characters in television